The Fanti drongo (Dicrurus atactus) is a species of bird in the family Dicruridae.
It is found in sub-Sahara Africa from Sierra Leone to southwestern Nigeria.

The Fanti drongo was described by the American ornithologist Harry C. Oberholser in 1899 from a specimen collected in the Fanti district of Ghana. He considered it as a subspecies of the velvet-mantled drongo (Dicrurus modestus) and introduced the trinomial name Dicrurus modestus atactus. The specific epithet atactus is from the Ancient Greek ατακτος ataktos "disorderly" or "lawless". Based on the results of a molecular phylogenetic study published in 2018, it is now treated as a separate species.

References

Fanti drongo
Birds of West Africa
Fanti drongo
Fanti drongo